Sergei Borisovich Ivanov (born 31 January 1953) is a Russian senior official and politician who has served as the Special Representative of the President of the Russian Federation on the Issues of Environmental Activities, Ecology and Transport since 12 August 2016.

Ivanov had held the posts of Minister of Defense of Russia from March 2001 to February 2007, of Deputy Prime Minister from November 2005 to February 2007, and of First Deputy Prime Minister from February 2007 to May 2008.  After the election of Dmitry Medvedev as President of Russia, Ivanov was reappointed a Deputy Prime Minister (in office: 2008–2011)  in Vladimir Putin's second cabinet. From December 2011 to August 2016, Ivanov worked as the Chief of Staff of the Presidential Executive Office. Having served in the Soviet KGB and in its successor, the Federal Security Service, he holds the rank of colonel general.

Before joining the federal administration in Moscow, Ivanov, served from the late 1991s in Europe and in Africa (Kenya) as a specialist in law and foreign languages. As an employee of the KGB in the Soviet-Union era, Ivanov became a friend of his colleague Vladimir Putin,
who appointed him as his Deputy in 1998. He belongs to the siloviki of Putin's inner circle.

Youth, education, and early career 
Ivanov was born on 31 January 1953 in Leningrad. In 1975, he graduated from the English translation branch of the Department of Philology at Leningrad State University, where he majored in English and Swedish. In the late 1970s, Ivanov began a career spanning two decades on the staff of the external intelligence service. In 1976, he completed postgraduate studies in counterintelligence, graduating from Higher Courses of the KGB in Minsk.

Upon graduating in 1976, Ivanov was sent to serve for the Leningrad and Leningrad Oblast KGB Directorate, where he became a friend of Vladimir Putin, then a colleague of his. In 1981, he studied at the Red Banner Institute of KGB.

In the 1980s, Ivanov served as Second Secretary at the Soviet Embassy in Helsinki, working directly under the KGB resident Felix Karasev.

After Finland, he was sent to Kenya as KGB resident.

In 2015, Ivanov stated that his career in the KGB had been ruined and destroyed because of Oleg Gordievsky's defection and exfiltration on 19 July 1985 from Moscow through the northwestern part of the Soviet Union near Leningrad and then through Finland to the United Kingdom. Gordievsky's defection greatly embarrassed both the KGB and the Soviet Union. As a result, the Leningrad directorate, which was responsible for surveillance of British subjects at the time, had numerous persons purged from its service by Viktor Babunov, the head of counterintelligence, including many people close to Vladimir Putin, who also served with the Leningrad KGB at the time.

Career in Moscow 
In August 1998, Vladimir Putin became head of the FSB, and appointed Ivanov his deputy. As deputy director of the Federal Security Service, Ivanov solidified his reputation in Moscow as a competent analyst in matters of domestic and external security.

Head of the Security Council 
On 15 November 1999, Boris Yeltsin appointed Ivanov as secretary of the Security Council of Russia, an advisory body charged with formulating presidential directives on national security. In that position, Ivanov replaced Putin as Yeltsin's national security adviser upon Putin's promotion to the premiership.

As secretary, Ivanov was responsible for coordinating the daily work of the council, led by the president. But Ivanov's role as secretary was initially unclear to media observers. At the time of his appointment, the Security Council was a relatively new institution. (The council was set up by Yeltsin's tutelage in 1991–1992). Between 1992 and Ivanov's appointment in 1999, Yeltsin used the council as political expediency dictated but did not allow it to emerge as a relatively strong and autonomous institution. According to Western analysts, Ivanov's predecessors in that post – including Putin – were either the second most powerful political figure in Russia or just another functionary lacking close access to the center of state power, depending on their relationship with Yeltsin.

Minister of Defense 
Ivanov was named by Vladimir Putin, who had succeeded Yeltsin as president on 31 December 1999, as Russia's Minister of Defense in March 2001. That month, Ivanov stepped down as secretary of the Security Council, but remained a member. Ivanov had resigned from military service around a year earlier, and was a civilian while serving as secretary of the Security Council. Ivanov therefore became Russia's first civilian Defense minister. Putin called the personnel changes in Russia's security structures coinciding with Ivanov's appointment as Defense minister "a step toward demilitarizing public life." Putin also stressed Ivanov's responsibility for overseeing military reform as Defense minister.

Unsurprisingly to specialists on Russia, Ivanov became bogged down in the sheer difficulty of his duties as Defense Minister. But, despite bureaucratic inertia and corruption in the military, Ivanov did preside over some changes in the form of a shift towards a more professional army. Although Ivanov was not successful in abandoning the draft, he did downsize it.

As Defense Minister, Ivanov worked with U.S. Secretary of Defense Donald Rumsfeld to expand Russian-U.S. cooperation against international terrorist threats to both states.

In May 2001, Ivanov was elected chairman of the Council of Commonwealth of Independent States Defense Ministers.

In October 2003, Ivanov claimed that Russia did not rule out a pre-emptive military strike anywhere in the world if the national interest demands it.

In 2004, Ivanov, as Defense Minister, pledged state support to the suspects in Chechen leader Zelimkhan Yandarbiyev's assassination detained in Qatar and declared that their imprisonment was illegal. Later, Qatari prosecutors concluded that the suspects had received the order to eliminate Zelimkhan Yandarbiev from Ivanov personally.

In January 2006, Ivanov received criticism for his downplaying response to the public outcry over a particularly brutal hazing incident at a military base in the Urals, which involved Andrey Sychyov as a victim, whose legs and genitals were amputated due to the vicious beatings and abuse.

From time to time, Ivanov has disconcerted Western audiences with the bluntness of his remarks on international military and political issues, though his political orientation is moderate and generally liberal on economic issues. In a series of public comments on the 2003–2004 elections, for instance, he unequivocally stated his opposition to rolling back the Western-style economic reforms and privatizations of the 1990s.

On 15 December 2006 in Moscow, Ivanov said to foreign correspondents about Alexander Litvinenko, poisoned in London in November, which made headlines in the West: "For us, Litvinenko was nothing. We didn't care what he said and what he wrote on his deathbed."

Deputy Prime Minister 
In November 2005, Ivanov was appointed to the post of Deputy Prime Minister in Mikhail Fradkov's Second Cabinet, with added responsibility for the Manufacturing industry and arms exports. On 15 February 2007, Putin relieved him of his duties as Defense Minister and elevated him to the position as First Deputy Prime Minister with responsibility over defense industry, aerospace industry, nanotechnology and transport In June 2007, Ivanov was appointed chairman of the Government Council for Nanotechnology.

2008 presidential election 
Because of Putin's popularity with voters, opinion polls and Russian political analysts expected Putin's endorsement to help any preferred candidate in the 2008 Russian presidential election. Speculation intensified in November 2005 with Ivanov's promotion to the rank of Deputy Prime Minister. The speculation further intensified in February 2007 with Ivanov's promotion to the post of First Deputy Prime Minister, but rumours ceased after the United Russia party nominated Ivanov's colleague Dmitry Medvedev to run for the presidency - with Putin's backing. Ivanov expressed his support for Medvedev's candidacy as well.

Russian opinion polls suggested that Ivanov enjoyed wide name-recognition among the Russian public with relatively strong approval ratings.

Ivanov's career, in terms of his background and rise through Russia's state structures, was often compared to Putin's, fueling speculation that Ivanov might run for president in 2008. Three months younger than Putin, Ivanov had been a student contemporary of Putin's in their hometown of Leningrad where both completed competitive specialized secondary-education programs (Putin in chemistry, Ivanov in English language) before attending Leningrad State University.
Both completed postgraduate studies in counterintelligence; and both joined the foreign intelligence service shortly afterward. However, according to Ivanov's recollections, he did not become acquainted with Putin during their time as students, but rather when both were assigned to work in the same foreign-intelligence division in Leningrad.

Chief of Staff 
In December 2011, Ivanov was appointed Chief of Staff of the Presidential Administration of Russia. He was noted for his hawkish views during the Russo-Ukrainian War and towards the West and his major role in lobbying for the Russian military intervention in the Syrian Civil War.

On 12 August 2016, Ivanov was relieved from his Chief of Staff position by Putin and replaced by Anton Vaino. Ivanov then became a special envoy for transportation and the environment. Putin's firing of Ivanov was part of a series of replacements of Putin's older peers with young loyalists. The Steele dossier (Report 2016/111) claims that his encouragement of meddling in the 2016 United States presidential election, which provoked unanticipated blowback against the Kremlin, was the catalyst for his firing.

Personal life 
Ivanov married in 1976 and has two children. His son, Sergei Sergeevich Ivanov, is CEO of the Russian state-owned diamond mining company Alrosa and a board member of Gazprombank. Sergei Sergeevich Ivanov was sanctioned by the U.S. in February 2022.

He is fluent in English and Swedish as well as speaking Norwegian, and some French. His hobbies include fishing, and reading detective novels in the original English. Ivanov supports CSKA Moscow, he can often be seen at PFC CSKA and PBC CSKA matches. 

On 20 May 2005, a Volkswagen driven by Ivanov's eldest son, Alexander (1977–2014), struck and killed a 68-year-old woman, Svetlana Beridze, on a zebra crossing. Charges against him were, however, dropped. Alexander Ivanov graduated with a degree in global economics from the Moscow State Institute of International Relations. He was deputy chairman of Vnesheconombank. He had a daughter. Alexander Ivanov died on 3 November 2014; he drowned in the sea in United Arab Emirates.

Sanctions 
On 20 March 2014, the American Office of Foreign Assets Control (OFAC) announced that Ivanov and 19 other Russian oligarchs  had been added to the Specially Designated Nationals List (SDN).

On 24 February 2022, the United States announced new sanctions against Ivanov and his son Sergey in response to Russia's invasion of Ukraine.

References

External links
 
 Interview with Sergei Ivanov, in HARDtalk (BBC).
 Sergei Ivanov Biography at spb.ru
 "Russian Defense Minister Arrives In Kyrgyzstan"

|-

|-

|-

1953 births
Living people
Politicians from Saint Petersburg
KGB officers
1st class Active State Councillors of the Russian Federation
Russian colonel generals
Russian diplomats
Kremlin Chiefs of Staff
Saint Petersburg State University alumni
Full Cavaliers of the Order "For Merit to the Fatherland"
Russian individuals subject to the U.S. Department of the Treasury sanctions
Russian individuals subject to European Union sanctions
Specially Designated Nationals and Blocked Persons List